Cody Hanson (born May 24, 1982) is an American musician, songwriter and producer who is best known for being the drummer and one of the founding members in the American rock band Hinder. He also co-owns the production company Back Lounge Productions with fellow Hinder bandmate Marshal Dutton.

Early life
Hanson was born in Plano, Texas but relocated to Jones, Oklahoma with his family when he was 1 year old. At the age of 12, Hanson received his first drum kit as a Christmas gift. He immediately fell in love with the drums and began teaching himself how to play, he started a band in middle school but lost interest in the drums by high school and began playing guitar.

Career

Hinder

Other projects
In October 2019 Hanson announced a new side band along with Hinder band-mate Marshal Dutton titled "Dangerous Hippies". The side project will be used to release unreleased tracks that didn't make the Hinder records. Hanson has also provided drum work in the country group Drankmore.

Personal life
Hanson currently resides in Oklahoma City, Oklahoma. He is married to his wife Danielle and is an avid animal lover.

Hanson was a supporter of former president Barack Obama. He had announced his support of 2016 presidential candidate Bernie Sanders.

Discography

EP's
Far From Close (2003)
Stripped (2016)

Studio albums
Extreme Behavior (2005)
Take It to the Limit (2008)
All American Nightmare (2010)
Welcome to the Freakshow (2012)
When the Smoke Clears (2015)
The Reign (2017)

References

External links
Hinder's official site

1982 births
American male songwriters
Musicians from Oklahoma
Living people
American male drummers
American drummers
Songwriters from Oklahoma
21st-century American drummers
21st-century American male musicians
Hinder members